The Linux Symposium was a Linux and Open Source conference held annually in Canada from 1999 to 2014. The conference was initially named Ottawa Linux Symposium and was held only in Ottawa, but was renamed after being held in other cities in Canada. Even after the name change, however, it was still referred to as OLS. The conference featured 100+ paper presentations, tutorials, birds of a feather sessions and mini summits on a wide range of topics.  There were 650 attendees from 20+ countries in 2008.

History

The 2009 Symposium was held in Montréal, Quebec.

The 2011 and 2012 Symposium were both held in Ottawa.

In 2014, OLS organizers put together an unsuccessful campaign on Indiegogo to raise funds in order to pay off debts from previous events.

Keynote speakers
1999 - Alan Cox
2000 - David S. Miller, Miguel de Icaza
2001 - Ted Ts'o
2002 - Stephen Tweedie
2003 - Rusty Russell
2004 - Andrew Morton
2005 - David Jones
2006 - Greg Kroah-Hartman
2007 - James Bottomley
2008 - Matthew Wilcox, Werner Almesberger, Mark Shuttleworth
2009 - Keith Bergelt, Jonathan Corbet, Dirk Hohndel
2010 - Jon C. Masters, Tim Riker
2011 - Jon "maddog" Hall
2014 - Jeff Garzik

Mini-summits
The Symposium hosted "mini-summits" on the day before the conference.  They were open to all conference attendees and had their own programme. Five mini-summits were hosted in 2008, including: Virtualization, Security-Enhanced Linux, Kernel Container Developers', Linux Power Management and Linux Wireless LAN. There were two mini-summits in 2009: Linux Power Management and Tracing.

See also
List of free-software events

References

External links
 
 Ottawa Linux Symposium 10, Day 1 at Linux.com
 Proceedings of the Ottawa Linux Symposium at kernel.org

Linux conferences